Matías Gómez may refer to:

 Matías Gómez (footballer, born 1995), Argentine defender for Deportivo Español
 Matías Gómez (footballer, born 1998), Argentine forward for Club de Gimnasia y Esgrima La Plata